Richenda Carey (born 9 April 1948 in Bitton, Gloucestershire) is a British actress who is mostly known for her roles in Monarch of the Glen, Jeeves and Wooster, Darling Buds of May, Crush and more recently, Separate Lies and Criminal Justice.

Carey was the third wife of actor Nigel Stock, whom she married in Bristol in 1979. After Stock's death in 1986, Carey married John Foley in 1999.

From July 2009 she appeared in Calendar Girls at the Noël Coward Theatre.

Filmography

Film & Television

Radio and voice work

References

External links
 

1948 births
Living people
English film actresses
English radio actresses
English stage actresses
English television actresses
Actresses from Gloucestershire
People from Bitton